The following is a list of native plant and animal species which are found in Britain, but only at a single location.

Key
Key to conservation designations for species:
 RDB - Red Data Book with three subdivisions
 (cr) - critically endangered
 (en) - endangered
 (vu) - vulnerable
 W&CA 8 - Schedule 8 of the Wildlife and Countryside Act 1981

Key to conservation designations for sites:
 NNR - national nature reserve
 SSSI - Site of Special Scientific Interest

Currently found at just a single location

Non-vascular plants

Vascular plants

This section currently lists non-critical species and critical species in the smaller apomictic genera; many microspecies in the apomictic genera Hieracium (hawkweeds), Rubus (brambles) and Taraxacum (dandelions) are also found at just a single site each.

Invertebrates

Vertebrates

Birds

Notes

 Common crane, although occurring in fluctuating numbers as a scarce spring and autumn migrant through Britain, with occasional individuals or pairs wintering or summering, has only established a single breeding population, in the Norfolk Broads (see Cranes in Britain for more details); the species was thought to be quite widespread in the Middle Ages, but the term 'crane' was also often applied to grey heron, making a reliable determination of historical status difficult.

References